State Route 333 (SR 333), is a south-to-north secondary highway in Blount County, Tennessee, that is 14.49 miles (23.3 km) long.  Its southern terminus is with US 321 and near Friendsville, and its northern terminus is with US 129 in Alcoa.

Route description

SR 333 begins in Friendsville at an intersection with US 321/SR 73 just southeast of downtown. It goes northwest as E Main Avenue to enter downtown, where it turns right onto N Farnum Street to pass through town before turning left onto Miser Station Road, where it leaves Friendsville and continues northeast. SR 133 continues through farmland and rural areas, where it turns left onto Quarry Road, before continuing northeast to pass through Louisville, where it has an intersection with SR 334, where it becomes Topside Road. SR 333 then has an interchange with I-140 (Exit 9) before continuing northeast to come to an end at an intersection with US 129/SR 115. The entire route of SR 333 is a 2-lane highway and runs parallel to the south shore of the Tennessee River.

Major intersections

References

Tennessee Department of Transportation (24 January 2003). "State Highway and Interstate List 2003".

See also
List of Tennessee state highways

333
Transportation in Blount County, Tennessee